Cyclone Quimburga, also referred to as the Lower Saxony Storm, was a deadly European windstorm that struck northern and central Europe between 12 and14 November, 1972. The storm has been described as one of the most devastating storm events during the 20th century.

The storm developed over the UK where it caused some localised damage in the south before moving across the North Sea where it underwent explosive cyclogenesis dropping from 969 hPa to 953 hPa. This development was fueled by the contrast between cold air in the parent low and the warm water of the North Sea. The greatest damage was reported across the German state of Lower Saxony, after which it is known in German as the Lower Saxony storm.

The storm destroyed the Königs Wusterhausen Central Tower, a  communications tower to the southwest of Berlin  and the church steeple in Berlin-Friedrichshagen.

The courtyard of the Royal Netherlands Meteorological Institute headquarters in De Bilt features a representation of the pressure map of the Quimburga storm.

References

1972 meteorology
European windstorms
1972 in Canada
1972 in the United Kingdom
1972 in France
1972 in Germany
1972 in the Netherlands
1972 in Belgium
1972 in Italy
1972 in Switzerland
1972 in Austria
1972 in Denmark
November 1972 events in Europe
1972 in Newfoundland and Labrador
1972 disasters in Canada
1972 disasters in Europe